An annular solar eclipse occurred at the Moon's ascending node of the orbit on February 7, 2008. A solar eclipse occurs when the Moon passes between Earth and the Sun, thereby totally or partly obscuring the image of the Sun for a viewer on Earth. An annular solar eclipse occurs when the Moon's apparent diameter is smaller than the Sun's, blocking most of the Sun's light and causing the Sun to look like an annulus (ring). An annular eclipse appears as a partial eclipse over a region of the Earth thousands of kilometres wide. Occurring 7 days after apogee (January 31, 2008) and 6.9 days before perigee (February 14, 2008), the Moon's apparent diameter was near the average diameter.

The moon's apparent diameter was 1 arcminute, 17.8 arcseconds (77.8 arcseconds) smaller than the August 1, 2008 total solar eclipse.

This was the first eclipse of the eclipse season, the second being the February 2008 lunar eclipse.

Visibility 

Centrality was visible from parts of Antarctica. A significant partial eclipse was visible over New Zealand and a minor partial eclipse was seen from southeastern Australia.

For most solar eclipses the path of centrality moves eastwards.  In this case the path moved west round Antarctica and then north.

Observations

The best land-based visibility outside of Antarctica was from New Zealand. Professional astronomer and eclipse-chaser Jay Pasachoff observed it from Nelson, New Zealand, 60% coverage, under perfect weather.

Images 
Animated path

Gallery

Related eclipses

Eclipses of 2008 
 An annular solar eclipse on February 7.
 A total lunar eclipse on February 21.
 A total solar eclipse on August 1.
 A partial lunar eclipse on August 16.

Solar eclipses 2008–2011

Saros 121

Metonic series

Notes

References

 shadowandsubstance.com Annular Eclipse of the Sun animated for February 7, 2008
 Photos of solar eclipse around the world
 Animation: Partial solar eclipse from New Zealand 

2008 02 07
2008 in science
2008 02 07
February 2008 events